Buckner is a census-designated place (CDP) in Oldham County, Kentucky, United States. The population was 4,000 at the 2000 census.

Oldham County High School is located in Buckner.

Geography

Demographics

As of the census of 2000, there were 4,000 people, 580 households, and 512 families residing in the CDP. The racial makeup of the CDP was 80.75% White, 18.25% African American, 0.07% Native American, 0.25% Asian, 0.38% from other races, and 0.30% from two or more races. Hispanic or Latino of any race were 0.72% of the population.

There were 580 households, out of which 49.5% had children under the age of 18 living with them, 80.5% were married couples living together, 5.9% had a female householder with no husband present, and 11.7% were non-families. 9.5% of all households were made up of individuals, and 2.9% had someone living alone who was 65 years of age or older. The average household size was 3.07 and the average family size was 3.28.

In the CDP, the population was spread out, with 14.3% under the age of 18, 12.5% from 18 to 24, 46.0% from 25 to 44, 23.8% from 45 to 64, and 3.5% who were 65 years of age or older. The median age was 36 years. For every 100 females, there were 349.4 males. For every 100 females age 18 and over, there were 461.0 males.

The median income for a household in the CDP was $81,548, and the median income for a family was $83,323. Males had a median income of $50,395 versus $31,484 for females. The per capita income for the CDP was $15,867. About 1.9% of families and 1.7% of the population were below the poverty line, including none of those under age 18 and 24.3% of those age 65 or over.

References

Census-designated places in Oldham County, Kentucky
Census-designated places in Kentucky
Louisville metropolitan area